Oil City South Side Historic District, also known as Venango City and Laytonia, is a national historic district located at Oil City, Venango County, Pennsylvania.  It is directly south of the Oil City Downtown Commercial Historic District.  The district includes 882 contributing buildings and 2 contributing objects in a mixed use section of Oil City.  It includes a large number of dwellings, commercial buildings, churches, and institutional buildings.  The houses were built between about 1863 and 1945 and are in a variety of popular architectural styles including Romanesque Revival, Late Gothic Revival, Second Empire, Colonial Revival, Classical Revival, Bungalow, American Foursquare, and Italianate.  Notable non-residential buildings include the Carnegie Library (1905), Latonai Theater (1928), Knights of Columbus Hall (1927-1928), Good Hope Lutheran Church Rectory (1928), Christ Episcopal Church (1886), St. Stephen's Roman Catholic Church (1906), and Second Lutheran Church (1913).  Located in the district is the separately listed Oil City Armory.

It was added to the National Register of Historic Places in 1997.

References

Historic districts on the National Register of Historic Places in Pennsylvania
Italianate architecture in Pennsylvania
Romanesque Revival architecture in Pennsylvania
Colonial Revival architecture in Pennsylvania
Gothic Revival architecture in Pennsylvania
Buildings and structures in Oil City, Pennsylvania
National Register of Historic Places in Venango County, Pennsylvania